Coco Lindelauf (born 17 January 2001) is a French rugby union player who plays for Blagnac SCR and the France women's national rugby union team.

Personal life
She grew up near Gruissan in the Aude department. She is of Dutch heritage but her parents, Micky and Roger, and her younger sister Roxy, settled in Southern France to start a bed and breakfast business when Coco was 6 years old.

Career
Having started as a No. 8, she played second row before settling as a prop forward when she arrived at senior rugby at Blagnac. She made her debut for the France national team in November 2021 against South Africa in Vannes. She was named in France's team for the delayed 2021 Rugby World Cup in New Zealand.

References

2001 births
Living people
French female rugby union players